Three ships of the Austrian and later Austro-Hungarian Navy have been named SMS Prinz Eugen in honor of Prince Eugene of Savoy

, a broadside ironclad that fought at the Battle of Lissa
, a casemate ship built in the 1870s to replace the original vessel 
, a dreadnought battleship built in the 1910s

See also
 , a heavy cruiser named in honor of the earlier Austro-Hungarian vessels and ceded  after the war to the US Navy
 , a British monitor named in honor of Eugene of Savoy
 , an Italian cruiser of the  named in honor of Eugene of Savoy. Ceded to Greece in 1950.

Austro-Hungarian Navy ship names